Allen Octavio Córdoba Pose (born December 6, 1995) is a Panamanian professional baseball infielder for the Algodoneros de Unión Laguna of the Mexican League. He has played in Major League Baseball (MLB) for the San Diego Padres. He made his major league debut on April 3, 2017.

Career

St. Louis Cardinals

Córdoba signed with the St. Louis Cardinals as an international free agent on April 12, 2013. He made his professional debut with the DSL Cardinals in 2013, and also played for the club in 2014, hitting .272 and .258 respectively. He was the Gulf Coast League Most Valuable Player (MVP) in 2015 after hitting .342 in 53 games, and won the Appalachian League batting title while playing with a .362 batting average with the Johnson City Cardinals in 2016.  With Johnson City, he made 220 plate appearances, batted .362, .427 on-base percentage, 16 doubles and five triples.

San Diego Padres
Córdoba was selected by the San Diego Padres after the season in the 2016 Rule 5 draft.  

Córdoba made the Padres' 2017 Opening Day roster.  At 21 years old, he had never previously played above Rookie League ball.  He hit his first major league home run on April 18, 2017, versus Jaime García in the seventh inning of 5−4 loss to the Atlanta Braves at SunTrust Park.  Córdoba was batting as high as .310 as of June 2, but he slumped afterward, and lost playing time as a result.  Cordoba made a total of 42 starts in 2017, 24 in left field, 15 at shortstop, 2 in center, and 1 in right, but only had 56 plate appearances after the All-Star break.  Cordoba made 11 of his starts in left in May after Travis Jankowski went down with a foot injury, but he was displaced by José Pirela, who came up in early June.  He saw more playing time at shortstop in June, but the Padres chose to stay with Erick Aybar, and then Dusty Coleman when Aybar was on the disabled list. Cordoba finished the season with a .208/.282/.297 batting line and 4 home runs in 202 at-bats.

Córdoba missed the beginning of the 2018 season with a concussion, and did not make an appearances in the majors after struggles in High-A with the Lake Elsinore Storm. On November 20, 2018, Córdoba was designated for assignment by the Padres. On November 26, Córdoba was outrighted to Triple-A El Paso. Córdoba spent the 2019 season in Lake Elsinore, batting .301/.367/.412 with career-highs in home runs (5) and RBI (43) in 105 games. Córdoba did not play in a game in 2020 due to the cancellation of the minor league season because of the COVID-19 pandemic. After the 2020 season, he played for Panama in the 2021 Caribbean Series.

Cincinnati Reds

On December 1, 2021, Cordoba signed a minor league contract with the Cincinnati Reds. He was released on June 19, 2022.

Algodoneros de Unión Laguna
On July 1, 2022, Córdoba signed with the Algodoneros de Unión Laguna of the Mexican League in 30 games he slashed .431/.478/.647 with 6 home runs and 22 RBIs.

International career
Córdoba was selected to represent Panama at the 2023 World Baseball Classic qualification.

See also

 List of Major League Baseball players from Panama

References

External links

1995 births
Living people
Dominican Summer League Cardinals players
Panamanian expatriate baseball players in the Dominican Republic
Gulf Coast Cardinals players
Johnson City Cardinals players
Lake Elsinore Storm players
Major League Baseball outfielders
Major League Baseball players from Panama
Major League Baseball second basemen
Major League Baseball shortstops
Major League Baseball third basemen
Naranjeros de Hermosillo players
Panamanian expatriate baseball players in Mexico
Panamanian expatriate baseball players in the United States
People from Changuinola District
Louisville Bats players
Algodoneros de Unión Laguna players
San Antonio Missions  players
San Diego Padres players
2023 World Baseball Classic players